Dietmar Hogrefe (born 23 August 1962) is a German equestrian and Olympic medalist. He competed in eventing at the 1984 Summer Olympics in Los Angeles, and won a bronze medal with the German team.

References

1962 births
Living people
German male equestrians
Olympic equestrians of West Germany
Olympic bronze medalists for West Germany
Equestrians at the 1984 Summer Olympics
Olympic medalists in equestrian
Medalists at the 1984 Summer Olympics